is a certified broadcasting holding company headquartered in Osaka, Japan. Until March 31, 2018, it was a unified radio and television broadcaster serving in the Kansai region.
On April 1, 2018, its radio and television broadcasting divisions were spun off into two subsidiaries, with  taking over the radio broadcasting business, and  took over television broadcasting.

History

 March 15, 1951 - Asahi Broadcasting Corporation was founded in Nakanoshima, Kita-ku, Osaka. ABC started AM radio broadcasting on November 11 (1010 kHz).
 May 25, 1955 - ABC and New Japan Broadcasting Company (NJB, the predecessor of Mainichi Broadcasting System, Inc.) founded  in Dojima, Kita-ku, Osaka. Currently, ANA Crowne Plaza Hotel Osaka is located at the place the head office of OTV used to be.
 December 1, 1956 - OTV started television broadcasting on channel 6, under the callsign JOBX-TV (not to be confused with Oita Asahi Broadcasting which currently uses the JOBX callsign). The station was a primary KRT (TBS) affiliate with a secondary NTV affiliation.
 1958 - NTV programming was dropped with the launch of Yomiuri Television.
 March 1, 1959 - ABC acquired OTV and renamed the television station  and its callsign of TV station was changed (JOBX-TV → JONR-TV).
 June 1, 1959 - ABC merged with OTV, and has been broadcasting both television and radio since then. The head office of OTV was named "ABC Dojima Station" for the use of the TV station.
 May 2, 1965 - ABC joined Japan Radio Network (JRN), and the next day it also joined another commercial radio network National Radio Network (NRN).
 1966 - Dispersed offices and studios were integrated into the headquarters building in Oyodo-minami, Oyodo-ku (present: Kita-ku), Osaka.
 March 31, 1975 - ABC pulled out of JNN and joined All-Nippon News Network (ANN) on behalf of Asahi Shimbun, one of major shareholders of ABC.  ABC was one of founders of Japan News Network (JNN), the first news network of commercial television stations in Japan.
 November 23, 1978 - The frequency of ABC AM radio changed from 1010 kHz to 1008 kHz.
 March 23, 2001 - ABC acquired ISO 14001 certification, the first broadcaster in Japan to do so.
 January 1, 2008 - The ABC logo was redesigned, featuring the call letters ABC and the name "Asahi Broadcasting Corporation", "朝日放送", "Radio", or "TV" under the slope line from the letter "C". A simplified version (only three latters of "ABC") is used in program credits. The current advertising slogan of the station, Info Designing ABC, was also launched.
 May 19, 2008 - ABC moved the headquarters from Oyodo-minami Nichome, Kita-ku to Fukushima Itchome, Fukushima-ku, Osaka.
 June 23, 2008 - ABC started broadcasting from its present headquarters.
 July 24, 2011 - Analog television operations ended on ABC at noon, in line with stations in most prefectures across Japan. The station now broadcasts in digital only.
 April 1, 2018 - ABC became a certified broadcasting holding company and renamed Asahi Broadcasting Group Holdings Corporation. Asahi Radio Broadcasting Corporation took over radio broadcasting business, and Asahi Television Broadcasting Corporation took over TV broadcasting business, employees, and administrator for ABC website.

Network affiliations

Radio

 Japan Radio Network (JRN)
 National Radio Network (NRN)

TV

 Japan News Network (JNN) (until March 30, 1975)
 All-Nippon News Network (ANN) (March 31, 1975 – Present)

Broadcasting

Radio
JONR
Osaka::1008 kHz, 50 kW; 93.3 MHz FM
Kyoto:1008 kHz, 300 W
Total:50.3 kW
Time: from 4:30 a.m. on Monday until 2:30 a.m. on Monday (24-hour operation)
Time signal: 523.251 Hz (C5)

TV (Analog)
JONR-TV (former callsign: JOBX-TV)
Channel 6

TV (Digital)
JOAY-DTV (former callsign: JONR-DTV)
Channel 15 (Remote controller button: 6)

Offices
Headquarters: 1-30, Fukushima Itchome, Fukushima-ku, Osaka-shi, Japan (Hotarumachi)
Tokyo Office: 10th floor of Nippon Life Hamamatsucho Crea Tower, 2–31, Hamamatsucho Nichome, Minato-ku, Tokyo, Japan
Nagoya Office: 9th floor of Ricco Sakae, 14-7, Sakae Sanchome, Naka-ku, Nagoya-shi, Japan
Kobe Office: Kobe Asahi Building, 60 Nakaniwamachi, Chuō-ku, Kobe-shi, Japan
Kyoto Office: Kyoto Asahi Building, 65 Yanagihachimanchō, Nakagyō-ku, Kyoto-shi, Japan

Programming

Current programming
Pretty Cure series (both with TV Asahi, onwards)
Police Academy (with TV Asahi, onwards)
Bonkers (with TV Asahi, onwards)
Freakazoid! series (with TV Asahi, onwards)

Former Programming
Saint Tail
Marmalade Boy

Animation

See also

Television in Japan
Osaka Tower

Notes

External links

Asahi Broadcasting Group Holdings Corporation website
ABC TV website
ABC radio website

All-Nippon News Network
Radio in Japan
Television stations in Japan
Japanese-language television stations
Asahi Shimbun Company
Companies based in Osaka Prefecture
Mass media in Osaka
Mass media companies established in 1951
Radio stations established in 1951
Television channels and stations established in 1956
Japanese companies established in 1951
Companies listed on the Osaka Exchange
Anime companies